Mountain View Hotel may refer to:

Mountain View Hotel (Gatlinburg, Tennessee), formerly listed on the National Register of Historic Places in Sevier County, Tennessee
Mountain View Hotel (Centennial, Wyoming), listed on the National Register of Historic Places in Albany County, Wyoming
Mountain View Country Inn (Lady Grey), an old hotel in the main street of Lady Grey, Eastern Cape, South Africa.
Elk Mountain Hotel in Elk Mountain, Wyoming, listed on the National Register of Historic Places in Carbon County, Wyoming and at one time known as Mountain View Hotel